The Baltimore Development Corporation (BDC) is a nonprofit corporation and public-private agency contracted by the City of Baltimore to promote economic development.

History/Mergers
The BDC is the result of mergers between the former Baltimore Industrial Development Corporation (BIDC), the Baltimore Economic Development Commission (BEDC); merged with in 1974-76 to form the new Baltimore Economic Development Corporation (new BEDCO), later the Howard Street Market Place; Charles Center–Inner Harbor Management (CC-IHM) (descendants of the famous re-development public-private agencies from the 1950s and 60's which transformed the old downtown and waterfront districts of the City, under the D'Alesandro,[Jr.]-Goodman-Grady-McKeldin-D'Alesandro,[III] city mayoralties) and the Market Center Development Corporation (which had merged with CC-IHM in 1989 to become Center City-Inner Harbor Development, Inc.) The BDC was eventually formed out of these agencies, commissions, corporations and groups in 1991.

The merger came in the wake of an expansion of the Open Meetings Act provoked by the City Council's frustration with the opacity of CC-IH.

Structure
The BDC is not directly accountable to the municipal government of Baltimore. However, its board is appointed by the Mayor, and many of its economic programs require approval from the Baltimore City Council.

"City of Baltimore Development Corporation v. Carmel Realty Associates"
The BDC has a complicated legal status because it is a public-private status agency, also a non-profit organization, but also closely involved in City business. Criticisms of the BDC's secrecy and its predecessors since the early 1980s amid infamous charges then of a "shadow government" against the administration of then Mayor William Donald Schaefer, (1921-2011), [served 1971-1986], by the then Baltimore City Council President Walter S. Orlinsky and long-time financial/political "gadfly" Comptroller of the City, Hyman A. Pressman, (1914-1996), which circulated in the Baltimore media, including especially The Baltimore Sun, resulted in a 2006 Maryland Court of Appeals case titled "City of Baltimore Development Corporation v. Carmel Realty Associates".

In this case, the court ruled that the BDC "was" subject to the Maryland "Public Information Act" and the Maryland "Open Meetings Act", rules that, like the federal "Freedom of Information Act", require government bodies to disclose information to citizens. The main rationale for this decision was the mayor's control over the appointment of the board.

The updated version of the Maryland "Public Information Act Manual" now reads: "A nonprofit entity incorporated under the State’s general corporation law may also be considered a unit or instrumentality of a political subdivision for purposes of the PIA, if there is a sufficient nexus linking the entity to the local government. See Baltimore Development Corp. v. Carmel Realty Associates, 395 Md. 299, 910 A.2d 406 (2006) (nonprofit corporation formed to plan and implement long range development strategies in city was subject to substantial control by city and thus was instrumentality of city subject to PIA)".

Tax credits
One of the BDC's major functions is to help businesses receive tax credits.  The official rule for these credits is a "but for" test: they are only to be used when the project would not go into effect without them.

The BDC mediates several types of credits:

Payment in lieu of taxes
Payment in lieu of taxes (PILOT) is an agreement under which a company can pay the city an agreed-upon amount instead of the property taxes they would normally be assessed.

The BDC controlled 12 PILOTs as of October 2011. These represented $12.8 million in tax exemptions; the properties corresponding generated $15.4 million in other taxes (e.g., parking, energy, telephone).

Tax increment financing

Tax increment financing (TIF) is a way of subsidizing current development based on the expectation of future tax gains. To pay for a TIF subsidy, the city issues a bond, which it expect to pay back based later from taxes.

The state of Maryland authorized Baltimore to use TIFs in 1994; however, the city was required to secure voter approval through referendum and none were issued. In 2000, new legislation allowed the city to implement TIFs without voter approval.

As of October 2011, the BDC had issued 10 TIFs in Baltimore. (With one TIF issued to East Baltimore Development Inc. under direct city control.) These already represent a debt for the city of $135 million, with $315 million worth of additional bonds still to be issued.

Enterprise Zone
The BDC is responsible for Baltimore City's Enterprise Zones (EZs); businesses inside these zones are eligible for special tax credits. EZ "Focus Areas" offer extra benefits.

Projects
The BDC oversees development of major downtown projects, as well as development of Baltimore city-owned business and industrial parks.

The corporation and the City are under public criticism for the planning, financing and construction of the Hilton Baltimore Convention Center Hotel.  The $301 million, 750-room hotel near the city baseball and football stadiums is an almost entirely publicly funded project (through city bonds), expected to open in August 2008.  Hilton Hotels Corporation is expected to contribute around $7.1 million to the project.

Emerging Technologies Center
The Emerging Technologies Center (ETC) is business incubator intended to support growing technology and biotechnology companies. The ETC has facilities in Canton and at Johns Hopkins Eastern. Its President and Executive Director since April 2012 is Deborah A. Tillett.

The ETC runs a program called "AcclerateBaltimore" that gives $25,000 to emerging companies trying to bring a product to market. Of the four companies receiving this funding in 2012, three are developing web applications and one concerns machine learning. The program requires these companies to stay in Baltimore for five years.

Current proposals
From the BDC press room:
 The Cordish Company is requesting a PILOT subsidy for a $65 million mixed-use development at 701 E. Baltimore St.
 Two companies have submitted competing proposals for a new carousel at the Inner Harbor between the Maryland Science Center and Rash Field (which has existed at that site for decades).
 The BDC is considering changes to the area eligible for Enterprise Zone status; these changes would subsidize a development at Harbor Point (near Harbor East).
Mayfair Theatre precinct

Legal status
The BDC was the subject of a 2006 Maryland court ruling declaring that its board of directors meetings and all internal documents were subject to Freedom of Information Act requests under the Maryland state sunshine law.

See also
Baltimore Area Convention & Visitors Association
Baltimore Convention Center Hotel Project
Baltimore Convention Center
Baltimore Visitors Center
1st Mariner Arena
Inner Harbor

References

External links
Baltimore Development Corporation website

Economy of Baltimore
Economic development organizations in the United States